Douglas Matera (born 8 May 1993) is a Brazilian Paralympic swimmer. He represented Brazil at the 2020 Summer Paralympics.

Career
Matera represented Brazil at the 2019 Parapan American Games where he won three gold medals and three silver medals.

Matera represented Brazil at the 2020 Summer Paralympics and won a silver medal in the mixed 4 × 100 metre freestyle relay 49pts event.

Personal life
His brother, Thomaz, represented Brazil at the 2016 Summer Paralympics.

References

1993 births
Living people
Paralympic swimmers of Brazil
Swimmers from Rio de Janeiro (city)
Medalists at the 2019 Parapan American Games
Swimmers at the 2020 Summer Paralympics
Medalists at the 2020 Summer Paralympics
Paralympic medalists in swimming
Paralympic silver medalists for Brazil
Brazilian male freestyle swimmers
Brazilian male backstroke swimmers
Brazilian male butterfly swimmers
Brazilian male medley swimmers
S13-classified Paralympic swimmers
21st-century Brazilian people